Alexandre Behring da Costa (born 1967) is a Brazilian businessman. He is a co-founder and managing partner at 3G Capital, executive chairman of Restaurant Brands International, a director of Anheuser-Busch InBev, as well as chairman of Kraft Heinz.

Early life
Alex Behring was born in 1967. He has a BS degree in Electrical Engineering from the Pontifical Catholic University of Rio de Janeiro (PUC/RJ), and an MBA from Harvard Business School in 1995, where he was a Baker Scholar.

Career
In 1989, Behring co-founded the technology company, Modus OSI Technologies, and remained a partner until 1993. The company has offices in Florida, US, and São Paulo, Brazil.

Behring then became a partner in the largest private-equity firm in Latin America, GP Investimentos, from 1994 to 2004. There he learned about investing and mergers and acquisitions from his mentor, the billionaire Brazilian financier and the principal of 3G Capital, Jorge Paulo Lemann. From 1998 to 2004, he ran América Latina Logística (ALL), a private sector railroad company with 13,000 miles of track in Argentina and Brazil.

In 2004, Behring co-founded the global investment firm 3G Capital and he remains the managing partner. The company has offices in New York City and Rio de Janeiro.  Behring is chairman of Restaurant Brands International, the Canadian holding company for the American fast food restaurant chain Burger King and the Canadian coffee shop and restaurant chain Tim Hortons.

In December 2014, The Washington Post reported that by moving its HQ to Canada, Burger King could save up to US$1.2 billion in tax over the next three years.

Behring was chairman of Heinz, and is the current chairman of the merged Kraft Heinz.

He is a director of Anheuser-Busch InBev.

The magazine Latin Trade calls Behring, "one of the most prominent representatives of a new generation of aggressive financial investors and managers of consumer-oriented services".

Personal life
Behring lives in Greenwich, Connecticut, US. He is married to Danielle Behring, who was born in Curitiba, Brazil.

References

1967 births
Living people
Brazilian businesspeople
Place of birth missing (living people)
Harvard Business School alumni
Pontifical Catholic University of Rio de Janeiro alumni
Brazilian emigrants to the United States
AB InBev people
Kraft Heinz people
Restaurant Brands International